Ruderman is a surname. Notable people with the surname include:

 Arcady Ruderman (1955–1992), Belarusian documentary filmmaker
 Jay Ruderman (born 1966), American activist and philanthropist
 Laura Ruderman, former Washington State Representative for Washington's 45th legislative district
 Yaakov Yitzchok Ruderman (1900–1987), Talmudic scholar and rabbi

Ruderman can also refer to Ruderman Family Foundation, a U.S. private philanthropic foundation